The South Australia Aquatic and Leisure Centre (SAALC), also known as the State Aquatic Centre, is a swimming venue located in the Adelaide suburb of Oaklands Park in South Australia. The centre is managed by the YMCA on behalf of the Government of South Australia.

In April 2011 South Australian Premier Mike Rann opened the Centre, the most advanced swimming and diving facilities in Australia, in Marion. He was joined at the opening by Marion Mayor Felicity-Ann Lewis. Lewis and Rann had championed the project for some years to enable Olympic standard aquatic sports to occur in South Australia.

The A$100 million centre was designed by Peddle Thorp Architects and constructed by Candetti Constructions. Built between October 2009 and April 2011, the centre was officially open on 26 April 2011 after the 2011 Australian Age Championships were held from 18 to 23 April.

On 1 July 2012, the Marion Swimming Club became the resident swimming club of the centre.

In the past the centre has hosted the 2012 and the 2013 Australian Swimming Championships. Located at the end of Westfield Marion.

More recently, the 2016 Australian Olympic Trials and 2016 Swimming Australia National Age Championships were hosted at the centre alongside National Water Polo League games and the 2016 Diving SA Olympic Simulation event.

In 2017, a joint announcement was made between The South Australian Government and Swimming Australia that the SA Aquatic and Leisure Centre will host the 2019 National Swimming Championships and the 2020 Tokyo Olympic Trials.

The centre is managed by Adam Luscombe.

Image gallery

References

External links
 

Sports venues in Adelaide
Swimming venues in Australia
2011 establishments in Australia
Sports venues completed in 2011
Water polo venues in Australia